is chocolate given by women to men on Valentine's Day in Japan as a customary gift. Unlike , which is given to romantic partners,  is a type of chocolate that women give to male co-workers, bosses, and acquaintances out of appreciation and politeness. Men generally reciprocate by giving women gifts on White Day, which is celebrated on March 14.

History

While Japan has a strong gift-giving culture, the origins of giving chocolate on Valentine's Day is unclear. One popular explanation is that the trend was started by junior high school girls, who would give handmade chocolate to boys to see if they returned their affections, and it later became commercialized in the mid-1950s, with the first Valentine's sale taking place in 1958 at Mary Chocolate.

Harumichi Yamada from Tokyo Keizai University stated that the practice of giving chocolate occurred because women expressing their love to men was considered disgraceful, and confectioneries capitalized on chocolate as a way for them to profess their love; however, as the social status of women improved, Valentine's Day was later considered a day where women give chocolate to men, through which the  custom emerged. Sachiko Horiguchi from Temple University, Japan Campus suggested that the  custom first occurred in the 1980s where working women were obligated to give chocolate to their co-workers and bosses, as both of the Japanese corporate and gift-giving cultures made it appropriate for this exchange to take place.

Japanese chocolate confectioneries make 70% of their business through Valentine's Day annually.

In the 1980s, White Day began as a tradition where men would reciprocate  gifts in order to boost sales. White Day gift sales are heavily influenced by sales from Valentine's Day.

Criticism
The tradition of giving  is losing popularity in Japan beginning in the late 2010s and is criticized for pressuring women to buy chocolate for their co-workers to avoid offending them. Some companies have banned the practice, citing it as power harassment. Instead, women opt to give  to their friends. A 2017 survey from 3M showed that only 40% of the women surveyed planned to give chocolate to their male co-workers, compared to 80% in a 2007 survey conducted by a different company. In 2018, Godiva Chocolatier also criticized the practice of giving  with a full-page advertisement, calling for workplaces to ban it entirely, though some critics have accused them of stealth marketing.

Honmei choco

 in Japan is chocolate given by women on Valentine's Day to men whom the giver has romantic feelings for. This is often given to husbands, boyfriends, and desired partners. Honmei chocolate is usually higher-quality and more expensive than giri choco ("obligation chocolate"), which is given to male coworkers and other men the woman has no romantic attachment to.

Homemade honmei choco is also popular.

This is generally reciprocated on White Day, celebrated on March 14, when men buy candy and gifts for women.

See also

Giri (Japanese)

References

Chocolate
Japanese cuisine
Giving
Japanese values